Anton Kučmín (born 6 July 1984 in Ilava) is a Slovak racewalker. He competed in the 20 km walk at the 2012 Summer Olympics, where he placed 23rd.

Competition record

References

External links 
 Anton Kučmín at the Slovenský Olympijský Výbor 
 

1984 births
Living people
Slovak male racewalkers
Olympic athletes of Slovakia
Athletes (track and field) at the 2012 Summer Olympics
Athletes (track and field) at the 2016 Summer Olympics
People from Ilava
Sportspeople from the Trenčín Region
World Athletics Championships athletes for Slovakia